Crunch 'n Munch is an American brand of snack food produced by Conagra Brands consisting of caramel-coated popcorn and peanuts. It comes in its original form of Buttery Toffee, as well as Maple, Caramel, Chocolate & Caramel, Molasses, Almond Supreme, French Vanilla, Kettle Corn, Fat Free, Sweet & Salty, Sweet & Hot and Premium Nut.

History
Crunch 'n Munch was first sold in 1966 by the Franklin Nut Company. In 1980, it was sold to American Home Foods (a division of American Home Products), which was spun off and renamed International Home Foods in 1996. In 2000, ConAgra purchased International Home Foods.

In 2004, the New York Yankees baseball team replaced Cracker Jack (which has a stronger molasses flavor) with the milder, buttery Crunch 'n Munch at home games. The club switched back to Cracker Jack after immediate public outcry.

See also

Cracker Jack
Poppycock
Fiddle Faddle
 List of popcorn brands
Screaming Yellow Zonkers

References

External links
 Official website

Conagra Brands brands
Popcorn brands
Products introduced in 1966